The  (English: Volkerak Dam) or  (Volkerak Works) is the name given to a group of hydraulic engineering structures located between Goeree-Overflakkee and North Brabant in The Netherlands. The works are not a single dam, but are composed of three distinct structures: a dam between Goeree-Overflakkee and Hellegatsplein, a series of locks from Hellegatsplein to North Brabant, and a bridge from Hellegatsplein to Hoekse Waard. The works cross three separate bodies of water: the Haringvliet, Hollands Diep and Volkerak. The works together comprise the fifth project of the Delta Works.

The works were conceived in response to the North Sea flood of 1953, as a result of which it was decided to close the inlets in Zeeland and South Holland. The committee which oversaw the Delta Works concluded that it was necessary to construct two compartmentalisation dams, the Grevelingendam and the Volkerakdam, in order to close the inlets. It was also deemed necessary to separate the Haringvliet from the waters to the south, in order to ensure the transport of drift ice from the Hollands Diep to the sea, and to keep the water quality of the (planned) Zeeland Lake acceptable, preserving it from contaminated Rhine water. 

In addition, a fixed water level on the Zeeland Lake was desirable for the purpose of shipping between Antwerp and Rotterdam, as the water level on the Haringvliet would vary due to the varying discharge of the Rhine. The construction of the Volkerakdam modified tidal movements across the entire area of the lower rivers, with extensive calculations made using the Deltar analogue computer to analyse these tidal variations.

The Volkerakdam has a supporting environmental function with regard to the primary dams of the Oosterscheldekering, the Brouwersdam and the Haringvlietdam, controlling volumes of freshwater from the Maas and the Waal which enter the waters around Zeeland. As a result of the closure of the Volkerak, the volume of fresh Rhine water entering the estuary decreased. Consequently, the salinity of the Oosterschelde remained relatively constant, increasing the ecological value of the estuary. 

In addition, the works removed the difficulties experienced by shipping from the limited (but very unpredictable) tidal currents in the Hellegat, which had previously resulted in many ships being lost.

Feasibility, planning and design

Johan van Veen made extensive studies of the Volkerak with a view to improving the situation, and in 1929 he came up with a solution in the form of guiding dams. Van Veen's work was successfully completed in 1931, and along with increasing the safety for navigation in the area, the works and his extensive studies provided significant detailed information essential for the design of the Volkerakdam over twenty years later.

The work started by van Veen continued with an extensive study of the tidal movements and associated phenomena such as sediment transport, tidal channels and detailed bathymetry being made over a number of years, with the objectives of increasing safety from storm surges and providing protection against saltwater intrusion from the sea.

The body responsible for design of the overall Delta Works scheme, known as The Delta Works Committee, had originally proposed to dam the Volkerak at the level of the Dintel river, and selected the location of the works in a more southerly location than the present position, with a shorter dam. During initial feasibility studies, the advantages of moving the works northward with a bridge crossing between Hellegatsplein and Hoekse Waard were identified, resulting in a decision to build the works in the present location. 

Due to the potential effects of the works on shipping between Antwerp and Rotterdam, the authorities in Belgium were involved in the development of the design. The increased cost of the resulting longer dam was mitigated by the fact that the more northerly location facilitated construction at a much reduced water depth. 

As was the case with two other Delta Works projects, the Grevelingendam and the Zandkreekdam, the Volkerakdam was designed as a secondary compartmentalisation dam, with the goal of reducing tidal current velocities in four surrounding estuaries to allow subsequent construction of primary dams.  

The effects of the construction of the Volkerakdam on tide levels in the area of the lower rivers has been identified at several locations around adjacent water bodies, as shown in the table and graph below. The changes to the tidal range were dependent on the direction and distance from the dam to the station location. In areas south of the dam, the tidal range increased considerably, whereas in areas on the north side the tidal range decreased. Towards Rotterdam, the influence of the Volkerakdam closure on tides became smaller. 

The design of the abutment caissons was undertaken to minimize scour downstream of the dam, arising from vortices generated by the large vertical head above the sill of the structure. The solution adopted was the use of specially adapted caisson units for the abutment ends, with a sloping bottom to fill the triangular void between the first caisson and the slope underneath, ensuring a good fit. The installation of these special units could be undertaken in a matter of days, therefore reducing the amount of time in which large currents were permitted to flow underneath the gradually closing hole, and limiting the potential for scour.

Construction
The project was constructed in stages between 1957 and 1977. By 1969, the dam works were complete, however Rijkswaterstaat then added a third lock and a sluice which took the overall project completion date through until 1977. The section of the works located between the Hellegatsplein and North Brabant is composed of a solid dam, made up of 14 caissons in combination with locks, providing the ability for shipping to pass between Rotterdam and Antwerp.

The first phase of the construction was the section of the dam from the shore of Overflakkee to Hellegat. The works in this location were constructed over a sandbank with low levels of flow, at around sea level, and requiring the closure of only one gully (the ). The construction of this section of the works had little influence on the local tidal movement. Approximately 1.8 million cubic metres of sand was used in the construction of this part of the works, undertaken by the contractor  for approximately six million Dutch guilders.

The next phase was the construction of a temporary work island known as Hellegatsplaat, from where the bridge over the Haringvliet was constructed and the dam construction continued. Unlike the previous section, a number of deeper gullies were present, resulting in the use of caisson closures, using a technique which had previously been implemented for the construction of the Veerse Gatdam. 

The caissons were prefabricated using precast concrete in a casting basin next to the locks. The embankments were constructed between 1967 and 1968, allowing the precast caissons to be placed. With the caissons sunk and completed, the final dam body was constructed, with the crown located 6 metres above sea level.

The caissons were 45 metres in length, 15 metres wide and had a height of 13.3 metres. The caissons were placed during slack water, with the intention of the structure reaching the bottom exactly at the moment of tidal reversal. Research during the design stage showed that there was approximately 80 minutes available for the entire caisson sinking procedure, and tests were carried out at the  laboratory in Delft to properly coordinate the caisson sinking maneuvers, which were undertaken using seven tugboats.

The closure took place on 25 April 1969. To increase stability during the towing and sinking processes, temporary stabilising boards were installed in the centre of each caisson unit. After completion of the closure, the re-usable elements from the caisson sinking procedure, including winches and sealing bulkheads, were removed and reused in the caissons of the Brouwersdam. The temporary casting basin for the Volkerak locks was also constructed in this section, with the soil dredged to construct this basin subsequently used as fill for the construction of ring dikes and the connecting road to Willemstad.

The scale of the works meant that construction was undertaken by a number of companies, including joint venture arrangements of Dutch and Belgian companies, formed from the contractors listed in the table below.

Road connections
Roads were constructed over the dam, creating traffic connections between South Holland, Zeeland and the west of North Brabant.

The Haringvliet Bridge
The Haringvliet Bridge is not part of the Volkerakdam, but forms part of the Volkerak Works. Plans for a bridge crossing of the Haringvliet had existed independently of the Delta Works since 1937, when a committee had investigated the possibility of establishing a permanent bridge connection between the island of Goeree-Overflakkee and South Holland. 

Following the disruption brought about by the Second World War, the plans for the bridge connection had come forward again in 1947, and by 1952 a route across Tiengemeten was proposed, but these plans were superseded after the 1953 North Sea flood disaster and the Delta Works plan. The option of including a bridge crossing as part of the Volkerak Works then began to be explored.

Construction of the bridge started in 1961, and was completed in 1964. Funding for the bridge did not come from the Delta Works budget, with the investment required to construct it covered by implementing a toll on vehicles using it. In 1975, the bridge was taken into public ownership under the management of Rijkswaterstaat, and the toll requirement was removed. The level of annual average daily traffic using the bridge far exceeded original estimates, which contributed to deterioration of the bridge resulting in emergency weight restrictions and bridge strengthening measures being introduced in the 2010s.

The Willemstad Man
On 21 April 1966, during excavations for the Volkerak lock complex casting basin, construction workers M. Ten Hove and A. Roelants discovered a small carved oak male human figure. Subsequent radiocarbon analysis dated the figure to the 5th millennium BC, during the Mesolithic period.

Media

See also 
 Delta Works
 Flood control in the Netherlands
 Rijkswaterstaat
 Johan van Veen

References

External links
Volkerakdam at the Watersnoodmuseum Knowledge Centre Information on the Volkerakdam from the official Watersnoodmuseum website

Delta Works
Dams completed in 1977
Dams in North Brabant
Transport in Moerdijk